Francisco Agustín Arroyo Vieyra (born 16 April 1959) is a Mexican politician affiliated with the PRI, who serves as Deputy of the LXII Legislature of the Mexican Congress representing Guanajuato. He also served as Deputy during three Legislatures (1991–94, 1997–2000, 2003–06) and as Senator during the LX and LXI Legislatures.

References

Members of the Senate of the Republic (Mexico)
Members of the Chamber of Deputies (Mexico)
Presidents of the Chamber of Deputies (Mexico)
Institutional Revolutionary Party politicians
Politicians from Guanajuato
People from León, Guanajuato
1959 births
Living people
21st-century Mexican politicians
Universidad de Guanajuato alumni
Members of the Congress of Guanajuato
20th-century Mexican politicians